The 14th International Film Festival of India was held as IFFI' 91 during 10–20 January 1991 at Chennai. The festival was made interim non-competitive following a decision taken in August 1988 by the Ministry of Information and Broadcasting. The "Filmotsavs" and IFFI 90-91-92 together constituted 23 editions of the festival

Non-Competitive Sections
Cinema of The World
Indian Panorama – Feature Films
Indian Panorama – Non-Feature Films
Indian Panorama – Mainstream Films

References

1991 film festivals
14th
1991 in Indian cinema